Bosnia and Herzegovina competed at the 2001 World Championships in Athletics from 3 – 12 August 2001.

Results

Men
Track and road events

Field events

See also
 Bosnia and Herzegovina at the World Championships in Athletics

References

Nations at the 2001 World Championships in Athletics
World Championships in Athletics
2001